Brian Tutunick is an American musician, more famously known as Olivia Newton Bundy, and was the bassist and co-founder of the rock group Marilyn Manson until 1990, when he was replaced by Gidget Gein. His stage name was created by mixing the names of Olivia Newton-John, singer; and Ted Bundy, serial killer.

In 1993, Tutunick's new band Collapsing Lungs (also known as L.U.N.G.S.) was signed to Atlantic Records.

In 1996, Tutunick, along with notable DJ Grynch created a new band, Nation of Fear. They released the song "Immortal" on a compilation CD for the (now defunct) rock station 94.9 WZTA. Later that year Nation of Fear would release their well-received self-titled album on DiMar Records. They would go on tour with Genitorturers and were even joined on tour by Lords of Acid. Nation of Fear (like their tour-mates) were known for stage antics including S&M, powertools, and pyrotechnics.

In 1998, the band's second release Everything Beautiful Rusts, while receiving much more attention, failed to keep the band together and by 2000 they had broken up.

References 

Living people
Marilyn Manson (band) members
American heavy metal bass guitarists
J. P. Taravella High School alumni
Alternative metal bass guitarists
Musicians from Coral Springs, Florida
Guitarists from Florida
20th-century American guitarists
Year of birth missing (living people)

de:Olivia Newton Bundy